100 Tears is a 2007 American independent black comedy slasher film directed by Marcus Koch and produced by Joe Davison. It follows the story of a circus clown going on a murderous rampage after being wrongfully accused of rape. The film stars Georgia Chris, Joe Davison (who also produced the film), Jack Amos, and Raine Brown, and was distributed by Anthum Pictures in 2007. The film was generally well received by independent horror film critics and has since garnered a cult following.

Plot

After being accused of crimes he did not commit, a lonely circus clown known onstage as Gurdy (Jack Amos) exacts his revenge on those who unjustly condemned him. The act sparks something inside of him which he cannot stop and now, years later, his inner-demons have truly surfaced. Part urban legend, part tabloid sensationalism... he is now an unstoppable murderous juggernaut, fueled only by hate. And worse, when two tabloid reporters (Georgia Chris and Joe Davison) attempt to hunt him down, they find themselves kidnapped and trapped in his warehouse, hunted by him and his conniving daughter (Raine Brown), who already has a deceptive plan up her sleeve. It's a gory, horrifying fight for their lives with no telling who will emerge alive.

Cast
Jack Amos as Gurdy the Clown
Georgia Chris as Jennifer Stevenson
Joe Davison as Mark Web
Raine Brown as Christine Greaston
Becca Wheel as Karen
Pauline Schaffer as Abby
Jenn Lee as Claire
Kibwe Dorsey as Detective Spaulding
Rod Grant as Detective Dunkin
Norberto Santiago as Drago Villette
Jerry Allen as Ed Purdy
Jeff Dylan Graham as Jack Arlo
Krystal Badia as Jill Bryner
Leslie Ann Crytzer as Tracy Greaston
Jori Davison as Roxanna
Brad Rhodes as Ralphio the Strongman
Regina Ramirez as Bookstore Patron
Clayton Smith as Young Gurdy

Production and release

100 Tears is a low-budget splatter film produced for around $75,000. It was distributed in limited theaters on June 23, 2007. The DVD version of the film was released on December 9, 2008. The film retains its NC-17 rating (for extreme horror violence) by the MPAA.

Reception

Though 100 Tears did not receive much mainstream recognition, it has received mostly positive reviews from independent film critics. The Scars Horror Reviews called the film "a big top blood splattering attraction," and that Jack Amos's performance as Gurdy the Clown "makes Pennywise look as harmless as Bozo the Clown". Johnny Butane of Dread Central gave the film three stars out of five, calling the film "at times genuinely funny, outright ridiculous, painfully bad, and screamingly entertaining." Horror Society praised the balance of horror and comedy, writing "humor can ruin a perfectly good dark and sinister horror film, but the balance in 100 Tears is in the right amount and does not seem to hurt the film in any way."

Jay Decay at HorrorNews goes on to say, "Blood, guts and gore flying left and right in every scene Gurdy's a part of, and let me tell you, it's extremely entertaining."

CultFlicks.net gave the film a 4 out of 10 star review, criticizing the story and lack of nudity for an NC-17 film, but praising the villainous clown stating "Gurdy is the king badass of your killer clown genre. Using a cartoon-sized meat cleaver, he out-butchers Pennywise, the Killer Klowns from Outer Space, and Pogo the Clown combined."

Awards

References

External links

 
 

2007 films
2007 comedy horror films
2007 independent films
American black comedy films
American comedy horror films
American independent films
Circus films
American slasher films
American splatter films
Horror films about clowns
American serial killer films
American exploitation films
2007 comedy films
2000s English-language films
2000s American films
2000s slasher films